Lichnov may refer to places in the Czech Republic:

Lichnov (Bruntál District), a municipality and village in the Moravian-Silesian Region
Lichnov (Nový Jičín District), a municipality and village in the Moravian-Silesian Region